The Mount Bozdağ is a mountain in the Caucasus Mountains near Mingechevir city, Azerbaijan. Near the mount, where the Kura River flows, Mingachevir reservoir was built in 1953.

See also
Ganja, Azerbaijan
Mingachevir reservoir

References

Boz
Bozdag